All Star Weekend may refer to:
Allstar Weekend, American pop rock band
NBA All-Star Weekend, American weekend basketball festival
NBB All Star Weekend, Brazilian weekend basketball festival
Philippine Basketball Association All-Star Weekend, Philippine basketball festival
All-Star Weekend (film), an upcoming film directed and written by Jamie Foxx